Joel Solon Spira (March 1, 1927 – April 8, 2015) was an American inventor, entrepreneur, and business magnate.

He invented a version of the light-dimmer switch for use in homes around the United States and led his Lutron Electronics Company into the production of lighting controllers.

Early life and education
Spira was born in New York City in 1927 to a Jewish family. He received a Bachelor of Science degree in physics from Purdue University in West Lafayette, Indiana, in 1948 and later sponsored, along with his wife, The Ruth and Joel Spira Award for Outstanding Teaching at Purdue's School of Mechanical Engineering.

Career
In the 1950s, he worked for an aerospace company, where he was assigned to develop a reliable trigger for atomic weapons. Suggested by others at the laboratory, he called on the thyristor, a solid state semiconductor switch. During his research, he recognized that the device could also be employed to vary the intensity of light.

A lighting dimmer existed at the time, but was expensive, complicated, and necessitated the use of large rheostats, about 10 in (25 cm) in size. Though there were dimming devices already in use for theater lighting, they were far too big and bulky for use in homes. Spira successfully manipulated a thyristor, a solid-state semiconductor small enough to fit into the wall box that housed a standard light switch. Unlike theatrical dimmers, Spira's standalone device was small enough for home application.

He resigned from his job at the aerospace laboratory to concentrate on refining the device. Spira then went on to conduct experiments on a ping-pong table in his Riverside Drive apartment in New York City, which led to a device capable of dimming the lighting in a home or office setting.

Lutron Electronics Company
Spira became—as a result of his discovery—best known for his initial, seminal invention: the first successful solid state-electronic dimmer. He filed for a patent on July 15, 1959 (U.S. 3,032,688). On the basis of the dimmer alone, he and his wife Ruth Rodale Spira, who was an active associate, founded the Lutron Electronics Company in Coopersburg, Pennsylvania, in 1961. The privately held firm, whose headquarters remain there today, has grown into an international manufacturer and distributor not only of dimmers, but also of motorized and automated window-covering systems, as well as lighting fixtures and temperature controls.

Spira headed the firm for 54 years and more recently became chair of the board and research director. He died in 2015 at the age of 88 from a heart attack in Springfield Township, Pennsylvania. He was awarded the ASME Leonardo Da Vinci Award in 2000 by the American Society of Mechanical Engineers

References

1927 births
2015 deaths
American inventors
Businesspeople from Pennsylvania
Businesspeople in electronics